The Democratic Party (DS) is a social-democratic political party in Serbia. It is led by Zoran Lutovac, who has been the party's president since 2018.

DS was founded on 3 February 1990 by a group of intellectuals as a revival of the Democratic Party which was active in the Kingdom of Yugoslavia. Dragoljub Mićunović was its first president and he led DS into the 1990 parliamentary election in which the party won 7 seats. DS took part in the March 1991 protests in Belgrade, while a year later, DS boycotted the May 1992 Yugoslav parliamentary election and declined to join the opposition Democratic Movement of Serbia coalition. A group of members led by Vojislav Koštunica were dissatisfied with the latter decision and then formed the Democratic Party of Serbia (DSS). Zoran Đinđić asserted control in 1993 and he led DS into winning 29 seats in the 1993 parliamentary election, while in January 1994 he was officially elected president of DS. Đinđić re-organised DS, led the party into the Together coalition, and took part in the 1996–1997 protests, which were caused after the Electoral Commission invalidated local election results in cities in which the Together coalition won. DS boycotted the 1997 general election and formed the  a year later, which became part of the Democratic Opposition of Serbia (DOS) in January 2000. DOS won the 2000 Yugoslav general election, but Slobodan Milošević, the president of the Federal Republic of Yugoslavia and president of the Socialist Party of Serbia (SPS), declined to accept the results, which culminated into his overthrow. DS assumed power after winning parliamentary elections in Serbia in 2000, with Đinđić serving as prime minister.

Đinđić was assassinated in March 2003 and succeeded by Boris Tadić as president of DS. Tadić led DS into parliamentary opposition after 2003 and was ultimately elected president of Serbia in 2004. Under Tadić's leadership, Čedomir Jovanović was expelled, who then formed the Liberal Democratic Party, while DS became part of a coalition government with DSS and G17 Plus in 2007. This coalition fell apart in 2008, after which Tadić led DS into winning the 2008 parliamentary election; DS then formed a government with SPS, its former opponent. DS was defeated by the Serbian Progressive Party in 2012, after which DS went into opposition. Dragan Đilas, the mayor of Belgrade became the president of DS in December 2012; Đilas was ousted as mayor in a motion of no confidence in September 2013, but survived the internal one in January 2014. This prompted Tadić to leave DS and form the New Democratic Party. Đilas was however replaced in May 2014 by Bojan Pajtić who later resigned in 2016 after that years parliamentary election. Dragan Šutanovac remained president until June 2018 when he was succeeded by Lutovac. Lutovac led DS into several opposition coalitions, boycotted the 2020 parliamentary election, which caused a schism inside the party, although he successfully led DS back into the National Assembly after the 2022 election.

DS was a catch-all party during its early period of existence, although it was also described as centre-right. DS was affiliated with liberal policies and it supported the establishment of a market economy, denationalisation, and union rights. DS was centrist and social-liberal under Tadić, while it was also the leading party of the pro-European bloc. DS is now positioned on the centre-left on the political spectrum and is associated with social democracy, while its supporters tend to be female, high school or university educated, tolerant towards diversity, socially progressive, and opposed to authoritarianism and nationalism. DS is an associate member of the Party of European Socialists while on international level it is a member of the Progressive Alliance and Socialist International.

History

Formation 

On 11 December 1989, a group of intellectuals held a press conference announcing the revival of the Democratic Party, which had existed in the Kingdom of Yugoslavia until 1948 when the Communist Party of Yugoslavia, later known as League of Communists of Yugoslavia, came to power. DS claims that it was "re-founded" instead of categorising itself as a new political party. The original thirteen signatories of the proclamation of the Founding Committee included Kosta Čavoški, Milovan Danojlić, Zoran Đinđić, Gojko Đogo, Vladimir Gligorov, Slobodan Inić, Vojislav Koštunica, Dragoljub Mićunović, Borislav Pekić, Miodrag Perišić, Radoslav Stojanović, and Dušan Vukajlović. These intellectuals were anti-communist dissidents, liberal academics, poets, writers, film and theatre directors. During the press conference, they proclaimed the "letter of intent", after which a larger number of intellectuals decided to join DS.

At the time of the proclamation in 1989, the Socialist Federal Republic of Yugoslavia was still a one-party state, while DS became the first opposition and non-communist unregistered party in Yugoslavia. However, after the dissolution of the League of Communists of Yugoslavia in January 1990, its constituent republics, later including Serbia, adopted multi-party systems. DS organised its founding assembly on 3 February 1990 at the Belgrade Youth Center. The presidency of the DS was contested between Čavoški and Mićunović, with the latter ultimately winning the position of the president of DS. Čavoški ended up serving as the president of the party's executive board while Pekić became the vice-president of DS. The rift between Čavoški and Mićunović, regarding ideological differences, had already existed, with Čavoški wanting to adopt a more hardline rhetoric and to focus on national interests. According to Mićunović, Čavoški initially registered the party in Tuzla, Bosnia and Herzegovina in March 1990 because Serbia did not yet adopt a law on the multi-party system, although DS was later registered in Serbia on 27 July 1990.

1990–1993 
Following the formation of DS, the party began publishing its newspaper Demokratija, while it also established the Democratic Youth, its youth wing. Gligorov and Inić, who worked on the economic programme of the party, left DS shortly after its formation; Inić left due to ideological disagreements, while Gligorov cited personal reasons. A month later, DS announced that it would take part in the 1990 Serbian parliamentary election. This decision was opposed by Čavoški and Nikola Milošević, who expressed their dissatisfaction with the decision of DS and advocated an election boycott instead. Čavoški and Milošević left DS shortly before the election and formed the Serbian Liberal Party in January 1991. Đinđić succeeded Čavoški as the president of the party's executive board. Despite winning 7% of the popular vote in the 1990 election, DS only won 7 seats in the National Assembly due to the first-past-the-post system which favoured the Socialist Party of Serbia (SPS), then-ruling party of Serbia.

Together with the Serbian Renewal Movement, it organised mass protests in Belgrade in March 1991, demanding democratic reforms. After the break-up of Yugoslavia in early 1992, Serbia became a part of Federal Republic of Yugoslavia. First federal parliamentary elections were organised for May 1992, although DS decided to boycott the election. A month later, DS concluded to not join the Democratic Movement of Serbia coalition, which was met with backlash from Koštunica. Koštunica soon after left DS with Mirko Petrović, Draško Petrović, and Vladan Batić to form the Democratic Party of Serbia (DSS). After mass protests in 1992, another federal parliamentary election was organised for December 1992. DS decided to take part in this election and it won 6% of the popular vote and 5 seats in the Federal Assembly. DS then joined the government led by Milan Panić, then-incumbent prime minister of FR Yugoslavia. Simultaneously in December 1992, general elections were organised in Serbia as a result of a early elections referendum that was held in October 1992. DS opposed this referendum, although it did take part in the election, in which it won 6 seats. In the presidential election however, DS supported Panić, who placed second, only behind Slobodan Milošević, the leader of SPS.

In 1993, Đinđić asserted himself in the DS and he operationally led the party into the 1993 parliamentary election. Milošević disintegrated his coalition with the Serbian Radical Party (SRS) in mid-1993 and turned towards DS for negotiations instead. Mićunović claimed that a meeting between Milošević and DS did occur, although Zoran Živković denies this. Đinđić invited several entrepreneurs to join DS during this period, which led DS to earn the "yellow company" nickname. Shortly before the 1993 election, DS agreed that Đinđić should be their ballot representative. He led DS under the "Honestly" banner and visited over 100 locations in Serbia during the campaign period; Đinđić also said that he would retire from politics if DS wins less than 20 seats. The campaign proved to be successful as DS won 29 seats in the National Assembly. DS remained in opposition after the election, despite the consideration that Đinđić would bring DS into the SPS-led government.

1994–2000 

At a congress on 25 January 1994, Đinđić was elected president, while Perišić and Miroljub Labus were elected vice-presidents of the party. Mićunović and Vida Ognjenović resigned from all positions within DS during the January 1994 congress. Đinđić commented that "Mićunović's time has passed... Mićunović is no Tina Turner who sounds better now than when she was 30". Mićunović characterised the manner of Đinđić's takeover of DS as the "combination of Machiavellianism and a revolutionary technique". During this period, Đinđić also benefited from discreet support in the Milošević-controlled state-run media. While some disliked how the transfer of power was executed, Đogo stated that he had found benefits in Đinđić's more agile approach. After Đinđić became the president of DS, the party moved from its "intellectualistic" approach that was present under Mićunović and instead re-organised itself to have a more modern and efficient organisational structure. Following the congress, entrepreneurs Slobodan Radulović and Radoje Đukić, who joined DS in 1993, were expelled from the party after they accepted the offer to serve in Mirko Marjanović's government. A year later, Živković and Slobodan Gavrilović were also appointed vice-presidents of DS. In the same year, Gavrilović proposed DSS to reunite with DS, although this proposal was rejected by DS. 

In December 1995, Mićunović left DS and formed the Democratic Centre (DC) in 1996. Together with SPO and the Civic Alliance of Serbia (GSS), DS united to form the Together coalition in September 1996 to take part in the federal parliamentary election and the Serbian local elections, which were organised for November 1996. DSS also took part in the coalition, although only on federal level. Together won 23% of the popular vote in the federal parliamentary elections, while it also won local elections in key cities such as Belgrade, Niš, and Novi Sad. However, the local election results were invalidated by the Electoral Commission, which ultimately led to mass protests which were attended by hundreds of thousands. The aftermath of the protests resulted into Đinđić and Živković becoming mayors of Belgrade and Niš respectively after the Electoral Commission recognised the results. Đinđić, however, was met with a motion of no confidence in September 1997, after which he was removed from office.

In May 1997, Perišić, Živković, Gavrilović, and Slobodan Vuksanović were elected vice-presidents of DS. The Together coalition was also dissolved shortly before the 1997 general elections. DS, DSS, and GSS opted to boycott the election, while SPO did not. Čedomir Jovanović and Čedomir Antić, who led the Student Political Club during the 1996–1997 protests, also joined DS in 1998. This coalition later became part of a wider alliance, the Democratic Opposition of Serbia (DOS), which was formed in January 2000. Đinđić faced Vukasnović at a party congress in February 2000, with Đinđić ultimately retaining the position of the president of the party. Živković and Gavrilović remained vice-presidents of DS, while they were also joined by Predrag Filipov and Boris Tadić. Vuksanović later left DS in October 2000 and formed the People's Democratic Party in 2001. Milošević, now president of FR Yugoslavia, amended the federal constitution for the 2000 general elections to be organised as a direct election, instead of an indirect one. DOS nominated Koštunica as their presidential candidate. Koštunica faced Milošević in the presidential election, which he won in the first round. However, Milošević declined to accept the results and the Electoral Commission reported that Koštunica did not win more than 50% of the votes in the first round and that a second round would be scheduled instead. This culminated into mass protests, which led to the overthrow of Milošević on 5 October 2000. The Electoral Commission published actual results two days later which confirmed that Koštunica won in the first round. Together with SPS and SPO, DOS agreed to organise a snap parliamentary election in Serbia in December 2000, in which DOS then won 176 out of 250 seats in the National Assembly.

2001–2004 

In January 2001, Đinđić was elected prime minister of Serbia; his cabinet was composed of 16 ministers. Following the extradition of Milošević to the International Criminal Tribunal for the former Yugoslavia in June 2001, DSS left his cabinet. Later in October 2001, Tadić and Živković retained their positions as vice-presidents of DS, while Jovanović and Gordana Čomić joined them. Additionally, DS adopted its new program, which marked the beginning of the party's programme shift towards the left. DS nominated Labus, now heading his own citizens' group, in the presidential election that was organised for September 2002. The election proceeded to a second round, in which Labus placed second, although considering that less than 50% of the registered voters turned out to vote, the election was invalidated and another one was organised for December 2002. Labus subsequently became the president of G17 Plus (G17+), a think tank that he registered as a political party. In the December 2002 election, DS initially stated that it could support Koštunica, although DSS eventually declined their support. The December 2002 presidential election was also invalidated as less than 50% of the registered voters did not turn out to vote, and another presidential election was organised for November 2003.

Đinđić, who was opposed to organised crime, escaped an assassination attempt in February 2003, although a month later, on 12 March 2003, Zvezdan Jovanović, a member of the Zemun Clan, assassinated him while exiting a vehicle in front of the building of the government of Serbia. Živković succeeded him as prime minister of Serbia and as the acting president of the Democratic Party. In the 2003 presidential election, DS, as part of the DOS coalition, supported Mićunović. He placed second, although considering that the turnout was only 38%, the election was again invalidated. During his premiership, Živković lost the confidence from the Social Democratic Party, after which he announced that he would not reshuffle his cabinet but call a snap parliamentary election instead, with the confirmation from Nataša Mićić, the president of the National Assembly, that it would be held in December 2003. DOS ceased to exist at this point of time, while DS nominated Tadić to represent its list in the election instead. In this parliamentary election, DS took part on a joint ballot list with DSS, DC, Social Democratic Union (SDU), and List for Sandžak (LZS). The DS list won 37 seats, 22 out of which went to DS alone, in the National Assembly, although DS switched to opposition. 

At the party congress in February 2004, Tadić and Živković nominated themselves as candidates for the presidency, with the former ultimately becoming the president on 22 February 2004. Gavrilović, Bojan Pajtić, Nenad Bogdanović, and Dušan Petrović were also elected vice-presidents of DS, while Mićunović merged his party and returned to DS after Tadić's election as president of DS. Additionally, Otpor, an organisation which played a key role in the overthrow of Milošević, merged into DS during 2004. The National Assembly adopted the changes to the Law on the Election of the President of the Republic in February 2004 which abolished the 50% turnout previously needed for presidential elections to be considered legitimate. DS then nominated Tadić as their presidential candidate in the election which was organised for June 2004. Tadić placed second in the first round, although in the second round, he came on top with 53% of the popular vote, defeating Tomislav Nikolić who was nominated by SRS. Later in December 2004, Tadić expelled Jovanović from the party due to breaching party protocol; Jovanović formed the Liberal Democratic Party a year later.

2005–2012 

During Tadić's first term as president of Serbia, he apologised to Bosnia and Herzegovina and Croatia for Serbia's role during the Yugoslav Wars and pursued pro-Western foreign policy. He was re-elected unopposed at the party's congress in 2006. In late 2006, G17+ withdrew from Koštunica's government, which led Tadić to schedule a snap parliamentary election for January 2007. DS chose Ružica Đinđić, the spouse of Zoran Đinđić, as their ballot representative, while DS campaigned on continuing Đinđić's legacy as well as fighting against corruption. DS also promised to not form a coalition government with SPS or SRS. In this election, DS won over 900,000 votes. DS negotiated with DSS and G17+ after the election and the government was formed in May 2007, with Koštunica remaining as prime minister while Božidar Đelić of DS was appointed deputy prime minister in his cabinet. In December 2007, Oliver Dulić, the president of the National Assembly of Serbia, announced that he scheduled presidential elections to be held in January 2008. DS then nominated Tadić for re-election. He again faced Nikolić in the second round of the election and was successfully re-elected.

Shortly after the 2008 presidential election, Kosovo declared its independence from Serbia. This, as well as the issue regarding European integrations, resulted in a political crisis between DS and G17+ on one side and DSS on the other. Koštunica stated that "he could no longer rule in a coalition with DS" which led Tadić to call snap parliamentary elections for May 2008. In this election, DS formed the For a European Serbia coalition, which was composed of DS, G17+, SDP, SPO, Democratic Alliance of Croats in Vojvodina (DSHV), and League of Social Democrats of Vojvodina (LSV). This coalition nominated Mićunović as their ballot representative and campaigned on continuing negotiations regarding the accession of Serbia to the European Union. ZES placed first, winning 102 seats in the National Assembly; DS won 64 seats out of those 102. After the election, DS was excluded from government formation talks, although in June 2008 it offered SPS to form a coalition government. DS and SPS agreed to continue the accession of Serbia to the European Union, work on fighting against crime and corruption, and enacting social justice. The new government was elected in July 2008, with Mirko Cvetković, an independent politician affiliated with DS, serving as prime minister and Ivica Dačić, the leader of SPS, serving as deputy prime minister. 

DS and SPS formalised their cooperation after the election by signing a reconciliation agreement, although disagreements between the two parties had continue to occur. The DS-led government was faced with the arrest of Radovan Karadžić, the Kosovo declaration of independence, and the global financial crisis, which led to low rates of economic growth. The Serbian Progressive Party (SNS), now led by Nikolić, also organised mass protests in 2011, demanding Tadić to call snap elections. Tadić later agreed to this and in March 2012 he called parliamentary elections for May 2012. A month later however, Tadić also announced his resignation as president for presidential elections to be held on the same day as the parliamentary election. DS led the Choice for a Better Life (IZBŽ) coalition which also included DSHV, LSV, Social Democratic Party of Serbia (SDPS), Greens of Serbia (ZS), and Christian Democratic Party of Serbia (DHSS). Dragan Đilas, the deputy president of DS and mayor of Belgrade, was chosen as their ballot representative, while DS campaigned on recovering the economy by emphasising on attracting foreign investments as well as developing small businesses. IZBŽ placed second and in comparison with the previous election, this coalition only won 67 seats, 49 out of which went to DS alone. In the presidential election however, Tadić placed first, though the election proceeded to a second round in which he lost to Nikolić.

Following the 2012 parliamentary election, SPS successfully formed a government with SNS instead, after which DS went into opposition. Đilas, who was re-elected as mayor of Belgrade, was positioned as a prominent candidate to succeed Tadić as president of DS. A extraordinary party congress was called for 25 November 2012, with Đilas and Branimir Kuzmanović being the only candidates to succeed Tadić as president of DS. Đilas was elected president in a landslide, while Tadić was approved to hold the title of a honorary president. Additionally, Pajtić was re-elected as vice-president and he was joined by Nataša Vučković, Vesna Martinović, Dejan Nikolić, Miodrag Rakić, Goran Ćirić, and Jovan Marković. The compromise between Đilas and Tadić for the latter to become a honorary president of the party received criticism from Živković, who subsequently left DS. After leaving DS, Živković announced the formation of his political party, which was formalised in April 2013 under the name New Party (Nova). After becoming the president of DS, Đilas ordered former government ministers to resign as members of the National Assembly. This order received support from Tadić, but was criticised by Mićunović and Dušan Petrović, the former minister of agriculture, who refused to resign.

2013–2017 
Petrović was expelled from DS in January 2013. He subsequently formed a parliamentary group named Together for Serbia (ZZS), which was later registered as a political party. Alongside Petrović, Vuk Jeremić, the former minister of foreign affairs, was expelled in February 2013. Jeremić claimed that the party's decision was unconstitutional and he filed a suit at the Constitutional Court. His appeal was rejected, after which Jeremić complied with the decision and left DS, although he kept his seat in the National Assembly. By this point, DS dropped to 13% of support amongst the public, while SNS received over 40% of support. Later in September 2013, Đilas faced a motion of no confidence that was submitted by SNS in which he was successfully dismissed. SNS cited poor results of DS and that "DS lost legitimacy" as their reasons while Đilas stated that "this is the beginning of a dictatorship and a one-party system". After this, local boards of DS called for Đilas to resign as president of DS, while the conflict between Đilas and Tadić became more evident. This resulted into an internal motion of no confidence within the main board of DS, which Đilas survived. Đilas and Pajtić also suggested that a extraordinary congress should take place after the Belgrade City Assembly election which was scheduled for March 2014. Tadić left DS on 30 January 2014, citing his disagreement with the leadership. Shortly after, Tadić announced that he would began collecting signatures to register his new party, New Democratic Party, which was later renamed to Social Democratic Party, to participate in the snap parliamentary election which was scheduled to be held on the same day as the Belgrade City Assembly election.

DS announced that it would take part in the 2014 parliamentary election with Nova, DSHV, Rich Serbia, and United Trade Unions of Serbia "Sloga", as part of the "With the Democratic Party for a Democratic Serbia" coalition. This coalition only won 19 seats in the National Assembly, 17 out of which went to DS while Nova won 2 seats. In the Belgrade City Assembly election, the DS coalition won 22 seats. After the elections, a extraordinary congress was organised on 31 May 2014 as previously proposed. Pajtić faced Đilas and was successfully elected as president of DS, while Čomić, Borko Stefanović, Goran Ješić, Maja Videnović, and Nataša Vučković were elected vice-presidents of DS. Đilas subsequently resigned from his position as a member of the National Assembly, while he left DS in June 2016. Stefanović left DS in December 2015, citing ideological differences, and then formed the Serbian Left (LS). In March 2016, Nikolić called for snap parliamentary elections to be held in April 2016. DS then formed the "For a Just Serbia" coalition with Nova, ZZS, DSHV, and Together for Šumadija. This coalition won 16 seats in the National Assembly, 12 of which were occupied by DS. After the election, a party congress was organised for 24 September 2016. Pajtić faced Dragan Šutanovac, Zoran Lutovac, and Srboljub Antić in the leadership election. He ultimately lost to Šutanovac in the first round, while Marković, Branislav Lečić, Nada Kolundžija, Goran Salak, and Tamara Tripić were elected vice-presidents of DS.

Later in January 2017, Šutanovac announced that DS would support Saša Janković in the 2017 presidential election instead of filing its own candidate. DS also called for others to rally around Janković as a joint opposition candidate. During the campaign, Janković used the infrastructure of DS to position himself as the leader of the opposition. He placed second behind Aleksandar Vučić of SNS, winning 16% of the popular vote. After the election, Janković stopped cooperating with DS and then formed the Movement of Free Citizens (PSG) in May 2017. In preparation for the 2018 Belgrade City Assembly election, DS advocated for the opposition to participate on a joint list. By the end of 2017, DS announced that it would take part in a coalition with Nova, with Šutanovac as the mayoral candidate.

2018–present 

DS and Nova were also joined by Tadić's SDS in January 2018, while the Green Ecological Party – The Greens also appeared on the ballot list. However, this coalition was defeated in this election as it only won 2% of the popular vote. This led to the resignation of Balša Božović, the president of the DS main board in Belgrade, and Šutanovac. DS later announced that a party congress would be organised for 2 June 2018. The leadership election was contested by Lečić, Lutovac, and Čomić. Lutovac ultimately won the election, while Nikolić, Aleksandra Jerkov, Dragana Rakić, Dragoslav Šumarac, and Saša Paunović were elected vice-presidents. Lutovac announced that DS "must organise itself" and that DS would cooperate with the Alliance for Serbia (SZS), then a group in the City Assembly of Belgrade led by Đilas. However, SZS was re-organised into a nation-wide coalition in September 2018, which besides DS also included ZZS, Sloga, LS, Jeremić's People's Party (Narodna), Movement for Reversal (PZP), and Healthy Serbia. Internally inside DS, founding members Mićunović and Ognjenović, as well as, Čomić and Šutanovac were opposed to joining SZS. After the attack on the leader of LS in November 2018, SZS organised mass anti-government protests. In January 2019, DS announced that it would boycott the sessions of the National Assembly, City Assembly of Belgrade, and the Assembly of Vojvodina, claiming that the bodies do not have legitimacy due to the obstruction of the government over the opposition by allegedly violating the rules of the Parliament, laws, and the Constitution. DS also signed the "Agreement with the People", which stated that if fair and free conditions are not met, it would boycott the 2020 parliamentary election.

Lutovac and Tadić began discussing about merging their parties to become "the main option for civic-democratic voters that will be able to integrate voters that are against Vučić" in February 2019. This decision was approved by both DS and SDS, while ZZS, now led by Nebojša Zelenović, also joined the talks. This merger was formalised as a union in May 2019 under the name "United Democratic Party". However, parties were supposed to officially merge once "the COVID-19 pandemic ends". During this period, SDS left the process, while Tadić later claimed that Lutovac allegedly put the end to the merger. As part of SZS, DS announced that it would boycott the 2020 parliamentary election in September 2019. The decision to boycott the election however received criticism from some members, such as Mićunović and Šutanovac, who stated that "some DS officials would form citizens' groups in order to participate in the election". During the session of the party's main board in November 2019, Lečić, Jerkov, Božović, Radoslav Milojičić, and Slobodan Milosavljević all left to attempt to bring down the quorum, and therefore call a new leadership election. Lutovac described it as a coup d'état and claimed that "Vučić is trying to break up DS". He also later claimed that a group inside DS is trying to turn DS to cooperate with Vučić. After attending a session in the National Assembly in February 2020, Čomić was expelled from DS. She was later featured on United Democratic Serbia's ballot list and became a minister in the government of Serbia. DS was initially supposed to hold a congress in March 2020 however, due to the COVID-19 pandemic it was postponed to 21 June 2020, when the parliamentary election was also scheduled to be held. During the party congress, a group of DS members left the congress to schedule an alternate leadership election. The congress continued on 28 June 2020; the dissatisfied group held the congress in Belgrade with the presence of Tadić, while Lutovac held the congress in Šabac. Lutovac then expelled Lečić, Božović, Milojičić, and Milosavljević from DS. The dissatisfied group then chose Lečić as the president, although the ministry of public administration and local self-government of Serbia later rejected Lečić's request to become the legal president of DS and concluded that Lutovac is the legitimate president instead. Lečić then formed the Democrats of Serbia which later merged into Tadić's SDS.

During the period of the conflict between the two factions inside DS, SZS was dissolved and succeeded by the United Opposition of Serbia (UOPS). However, UOPS was dissolved by January 2021, as disputes between Narodna and Party of Freedom and Justice (SSP), the party led by Đilas, continued to exist. Paunović, who left DS to take part with his citizens' group in a local election in 2020, was allowed to join back in April 2021. DS then organised a congress on 4 July 2021; Lutovac was re-elected president and Rakić was re-elected deputy president of DS, while Tatjana Manojlović, Nenad Mitrović, Miodrag Gavrilović, and Branimir Jovančićević were elected vice-presidents of DS. After the congress, DS, Narodna, SSP, and PSG announced their cooperation for the 2022 Serbian general election. This cooperation was formalised in February 2022 under the name United for the Victory of Serbia (UZPS); they nominated Zdravko Ponoš of Narodna as their presidential candidate. UZPS won 14% of the popular vote in the parliamentary election; DS won 10 seats. Ponoš also placed second in the presidential election. After the election, UZPS was dissolved, with Lutovac stating that "it was only a pre-election coalition". Shortly before the first constitutive session of the National Assembly on 1 August 2022, Narodna, DS, Do not let Belgrade drown and Together proposed Lutovac as the vice-presidential candidate for the National Assembly. He was successfully elected on 2 August 2022. The Movement of Free Serbia, which was apart of the UZPS coalition, merged into DS in September 2022.

Ideology and platform

Mićunović and Đinđić era 
DS was a catch-all party during its early period and it was composed of ideologically heterogeneous groups. It included the founders of the Praxis School, Mićunović and Đinđić, who were noted as liberals, while Čavoški, Koštunica, and Milošević argued to adopt a stronger anti-communist position inside DS. DS was also divided regarding national issues, with individuals such as Gligorov and Inić who believed that national issues should be solved within a common Yugoslav state, while Đogo favoured a Greater Serbian policy. DS supported mixed economy with a strong role of the market, while it also wanted to implement reforms towards establishing a modern market economy and to integrate Serbia into the European Community. Political scientist Dijana Vukomanović stated that DS has promoted liberalism in an economic and democratic sense since its formation, while in its 1990 programme she has noted that DS also put a strong emphasis on establishing a representative parliamentary democracy and on advancing human and political freedoms as well as civic rights. Regarding Yugoslavia, DS supported federalisation and opted to create a pluralistic democratic order to guarantee human security and freedom to decrease ethnic conflicts. 

Despite this, DS wanted to adopt "civic and centrist identity", while in its "letter of intent" in December 1989, it stated its support for the establishment of a democratic and multi-party system. Political scientist Vukašin Pavlović noted that DS could be positioned on the centre-right when it was formed in 1990 due to their founders ideological profiles, while Marko Stojić, a Metropolitan University Prague lecturer, described it as centre-right due to their programme that advocated liberal market economy and minimal role for the state. Considering that it opposed the 1990 constitution as DS believed that it should be voted in a multi-party system, political scientist Vladimir Goati noted that DS described DS as an anti-system party. The Washington Post journalist Blaine Harden described DS in 1991 as a "moderate opposition" party. DS identified itself as a "civic, national, liberal, and socially responsible" party in their 1992 programme, and that DS "provides a balance of goals of the right and left political traditions". Regarding national issues, DS supported the "modernisation of the country" as well as the self-determination of Serbs, although political scientist Jovan Komšić noted that DS moderated its stance on nationalism after the 1995 Dayton Agreement and instead focused on the "democratisation of Serbia". DS was also supportive of private property rights while it was also noted that in their 1992 programme there were no mentions regarding regulatory and redistributive functions of the state. During this point of time, DS was positioned on the moderate right according to Goati. He also categorised it as a liberal-democratic party, while after 1993 he noted that DS began using less anti-communist rhetoric in comparison with other opposition parties. Political scientist Slobodan Antonić also noted that DS was formed as a civic party, but had a "nationalistic phase" in mid-1990s, and then soon after it returned to civic positions. In a 1999 report, BBC News described DS as centrist.

DS was initially positioned as a right-liberal party, but throughout time it shifted towards the liberal centre. Under Đinđić, DS shifted to more pragmatic and flexible approaches and principles and DS became the leading anti-Milošević party after 1998. Đinđić has been described as a pro-Western reformist and a technocrat. DS advocated for denationalisation and free mass distribution of shares as well as establishing the Centre for Privatisation. However, DS also supported right to work, trade union rights, social security, and fight against unemployment. DS described these economic positions as "people's capitalism", but DS dropped these positions after coming to power in 2001, when it began promoting neoliberalism; it was also associated with the "shock therapy". Under Đinđić, DS supported policies that would bring Serbia closer to the West, reintegrate Serbia into the international community, as well as, extradite Serbian citizens that were indicted by the ICTY.

Tadić era 

Despite trying to position itself as a social-democratic party after Đinđić's assassination, Vukomanović noted that the leadership of DS did not "dare to take a decisive step towards the left". Political scientist Zoran Stojiljković instead noted that it shifted towards social liberalism. On the other hand, political scientist Zoran Slavujević argued in 2003 that DS "was positioned between the centre and centre-right". Under Tadić, DS was centrist, and it was associated with liberalism, and social liberalism. Tadić has been described as a liberal, a description which he accepts, and was considered to be popular among businessmen, while he also had supported the accession of Serbia to the European Union. Despite being supported by liberals, DS would also occasionally position itself as a "state-building party of the centre-left". During his tenure, DS was the leading party of the liberal and pro-European bloc, while DS also believed that privatisation would accelerate Serbia's economic development. Stojić noted that the programmatic shift towards social democracy began in 2007, although he also concluded that while in government, DS did not pursue social-democratic agenda. 

DS has been described as internationalist, pro-Western, and although it declared itself to be in favour of military neutrality, DS has expressed sympathy for NATO, while its government ministers also cooperated with NATO. DS also believed that the political status of Kosovo should be solved via diplomacy, although following the declaration of independence of Kosovo in 2008, DS did not adopt a clear stance regarding the issue. Under Tadić, DS also practised on balancing foreign relations; for example, a year after the proclamation of Kosovo, Tadić hosted Joe Biden, then-vice-president of the United States, and Dmitry Medvedev, then-president of Russia. Shortly before the 2012 elections, Serbia received candidate status for European Union membership. To attract ethnic minority voters, DS exploited the cultural-ideological cleft in Vojvodina, while it also promoted regionalism. DS also advocated improving the standard of living and balanced regional development. Regarding judiciary, DS proposed the creation of an independent body that would implement anti-corruption measures.

Post-Tadić era 
After 2012, DS shifted more to the left and began identifying itself as social-democratic, a description which has been since then accepted by scholars. Stojić also noted that DS superseded its liberal ideology. DS is now positioned on the centre-left on the political spectrum, while according to Dušan Spasojević, a professor at the Faculty of Political Sciences of University of Belgrade, its social views are also orientated towards the left. DS declares itself to be "the bearer of the most progressive ideas", while it is also in favour of protecting workers, minorities, the environment, as well as supporting guaranteed rights to healthcare, education, and pensions.

Đilas led DS into opposition to SNS, while he also pledged to provide free textbooks, full salaries for pregnant women, increase wages for healthcare workers, and help pensioners with low pensions during the 2014 election period. The current leader of DS, Zoran Lutovac, describes himself as a leftist. DS has condemned violence against the LGBT community, while in August 2022 it had voiced its support for the organisation of 2022 EuroPride in Belgrade. The Gay–straight alliance, an association that promotes LGBT rights in Serbia, had described DS as the "most positive party towards the LGBT community" in 2014.

Demographic characteristics 
According to an opinion poll that was conducted by the Institute of Social Sciences before the December 1992 federal parliamentary election, a majority of DS supporters preferred a citizen state than a nation state. According to political scientist Dragomir Pantić, supporters of DS in the 1990s shared similar characteristics with supporters of DSS, GSS, and minority parties. Their supporters were younger and urban and they came from middle or higher societal classes. This group also included intellectuals, servants, and experts who tended to work in the private sector. After 2000, their voters professed liberal-democratic values, while they were also less religious, opposed to authoritarianism, centralism, and supportive of reforms. Political scientist Ilija Vujačić noted that their supporters also shifted more towards the political centre. According to an opinion poll from 2005, 66% of DS supporters stated that Serbia should rely on the European Union in regards to foreign policy.

In 2007, political scientist Srećko Mihailović noted that a majority of DS supporters declared themselves to be on the left; 18% declared themselves on the far-left, 22% on the left-wing, 25% on the centre-left, while 18% declared themselves as centrist. The Centre for Free Elections and Democracy (CeSID) noted that in opinion polls before the 2008 elections, a majority of DS supporters declared themselves to be pro-European. CeSID later noted that a majority of DS voters tend to be female, below 50 years old, and that they either possess a high school or university diploma. Regarding the social status of their supporters, they were mostly supported by workers, technicians, officials, and dependents. In 2014, CeSID reported that 80% of DS supporters were female, that 60% of supporters were under 50 years old, and that a majority of the supporters either had a high school or university diploma. DS supporters were also noted to hold tolerant positions regarding diversity and that they rejected authoritarianism and nationalism. According to a 2016 Nova srpska politička misao opinion poll, most of DS supporters were younger than 40. According to a Heinrich Böll Foundation research from November 2020, supporters of DS saw themselves as socially progressive.

Organisation 
DS is currently led by Zoran Lutovac who was elected president in 2018. At the party congress in 2021, Lutovac was re-elected president while Rakić currently serves as deputy president; Jovančićević, Gavrilović, Mitrović, and Manojlović currently serve as vice-presidents. Additionally, Lutovac is the party's parliamentary leader in the National Assembly.

Its headquarters are at Nušićeva 6/II in Belgrade. DS previously published Demokratija, its newspaper, from 1990 to 1998, while it currently publishes the newspaper Bedem, which was initially set up as a political campaign in July 2021. Its youth wing, the Democratic Youth, has been led by Stefan Ninić since February 2022, while DS also operates a women's wing that is named Women's Forum. In its statute, DS states that every adult citizen of Serbia can become its member, although the citizen must not already be a member of another political organisation. In December 2010, DS reported that they had 185,192 members, while by 2013, they had reported to have had 196,673 members. Despite this, only 18,459 members of DS had the right to vote in the leadership election in 2016.

DS has city, local, and municipal branches as well as a special branch for Vojvodina. Regarding its internal bodies, it has an assembly, a main board, a presidency, an executive board, a statutory commission which includes the centre of departmental committees and the centre for education, a supervisory board, a political council, and an ethics committee. DS also operates the Foundation for Improving Democracy "Ljuba Davidović". The main board is the highest body of DS, while the president of DS represents and manages the party.

International cooperation 
DS has been a member of the Socialist International since 2003, while in December 2006 it became an associate member of the Party of European Socialists. According to Doris Pack, a German politician and close friend of Đinđić, the decision to apply to become an associate member of the Party of European Socialists was Đinđić's decision, with Zoran Alimpić, a senior DS official, stating that the decision came as a surprise to senior officials inside DS. DS is also affiliated with the Progressive Alliance, and is listed as its member on their website. Its youth wing is a member of the Young European Socialists, while it is also listed as a full member on International Union of Socialist Youth's website.

Together with Sergey Stanishev, then-president of the Party of European Socialists, Victor Ponta, then-leader of the Social Democratic Party of Romania, and Zlatko Lagumdžija, then-leader of the Social Democratic Party of Bosnia and Herzegovina, Pajtić met with Li Yuanchao, a official of the Chinese Communist Party, in 2014 to discuss about the economic conditions between China and Europe. In 2017, Šutanovac met with Zoran Zaev, the leader of the Social Democratic Union of Macedonia, where they discussed about regional cooperation, Serbia's and North Macedonia's integration into the European Union, as well as personal cooperation inside the Party of European Socialists.

List of presidents

Electoral performance

Parliamentary elections

Presidential elections

Federal parliamentary elections

Federal presidential elections

References

Primary sources 
In the text these references are preceded by a double dagger (‡):

External links 

Official website

1990 establishments in Serbia
Full member parties of the Socialist International
Liberal parties in Serbia
Political parties established in 1990
Parties related to the Party of European Socialists
Political parties in Yugoslavia
Pro-European political parties in Serbia
Progressive Alliance
Social democratic parties in Serbia
Social liberal parties
Centre-right parties in Europe
Centrist parties in Serbia
Centre-left parties in Europe
Anti-communist parties